A screw turbine (also known as an Archimedian turbine, Archimedes screw generator or ASG, or Archimedes screw turbine or AST) is water turbine that converts the potential energy of water on an upstream level into work. This hydropower converter is driven by the weight of water, similar to water wheels, and can be considered as a quasi-static pressure machine. Archimedes screw generators operate in a wide range of flows (0.01  to 14.5 ) and heads (0.1 m to 10 m), including low heads and moderate flow rates that are not ideal for traditional turbines and not occupied by high performance technologies. The length of the smallest and longest Archimedes screw generators are 1 m an 30 m respectively. 

Archimedes' screw can be used to generate power if they are driven by flowing fluid instead of lifting fluid. Water transiting the screw from high to low elevation generates a torque on the helical plane surfaces, causing the screw to rotate. The Archimedes screw generator consists of a rotor in the shape of an Archimedean screw which rotates in a semicircular trough. Water flows into the screw and its weight presses down onto the blades of the turbine, which in turn forces the turbine to turn. Water flows freely off the end of the screw into the river. The upper end of the screw is connected to a generator through a gearbox. The Archimedes screw is theoretically a reversible hydraulic machine, and there are examples of single installations where screws can be used alternately as pumps and generators.

History 

The Archimedean screw is an ancient invention, attributed to Archimedes of Syracuse (287–212 BC.), and commonly used to raise water from a watercourse for irrigation purposes. In 1819 the French engineer Claude Louis Marie Henri Navier (1785–1836) suggested using the Archimedean screw as a type of water wheel. In 1916 William Moerscher applied for a U.S. patent on the hydrodynamic screw turbine.

Application 

The Archimedean screw turbine is applied on rivers with a relatively low head (from 0.1 m to 10 m) and on low flows (0.01 m³/s up to around 10 m³/s on one turbine). Due to the construction and slow movement of the blades of the turbine, the turbine is considered to be friendly to aquatic wildlife. It is often labelled as "fish friendly". The Archimedean turbine may be used in situations where there is a stipulation for the preservation and care of the environment and wildlife.

Design 

An Archimedes Screw Turbine (AST) hydroelectricity powerplant can be considered as a system with three major components: a reservoir, a weir, and the AST (which is connected to the system by a control gate and trash rack). At most real AST locations, the incoming flow must be divided between the AST and a parallel weir. Typically, a minimum flow over the weir is mandated for the protection of the local environment. Other outlets as well as a fish ladder could be considered as the other components of this system. A comprehensive guide about the principles of designing Archimedes screw turbines and screw hydropower plants is available in "Archimedes Screw Turbines: A Sustainable Development Solution for Green and Renewable Energy Generation—A Review of Potential and Design Procedures".

Flow rate 

To design Archimedes screw turbines and hydropower plants, it is essential to estimate the amount of water is passing through the screw turbine since the amount of power generated by an Archimedes screw turbine is proportional to the volume flow rate of water through it. The volume of water that enters an Archimedes screw turbine depends on the inlet water depth and the screw's rotation speed. To estimates the total flow rate passing through an Archimedes screw turbine for different rotation speeds (ω) and inlet water levels the following equation could be used:

Design 

By determination of  other design parameters of Archimedes screws could be easily calculated using an easy an step by step analytical method. Studies shows that the volume of flow passes through Archimedes screws is a function of inlet depth, diameter and rotation speed of the screw.

Based on the common standards that the Archimedes screw designers use this analytical equation could be simplified as:

The value of η could simply determinate using the  graph or  graph. By determination of  other design parameters of Archimedes screws could be easily calculated using an easy an step by step analytical method.

Examples 

 United Kingdom
 Woolston, Cheshire weir on the River Mersey 486 kW, Under construction
 Devon, Totnes  320 kW , Commissioned December 2015
 Romney, Berkshire, 270 kW, Installed to provide a renewable source of energy to Windsor Castle, Commissioned July 2013
 Bealey’s Weir, Radcliffe, 100 kW, Commissioned May 2012
 Mapledurham, River Thames, UK’s largest flow capacity (8 m³/s) single screw, 99 kW.
 Buckfast, River Dart, screw turbine and fishpass, 84 kW
 UK’s first community owned hydro scheme, and fishpass, 63 kW at New Mills.
 UK’s first grid connected screw turbine, 50 kW at River Dart Country Park.
 Bainbridge, community owned screw turbine, 37 kW
 Tipton, River Otter, 30 kW
 Rochdale, screw turbine and fishpass, 20 kW
 Cragside, the birthplace of hydroelectricity, 12 kW
 United States
 Hanover Pond on the Quinnipiac River in Meriden, Connecticut, 105 kW (or 920,000 kWh/year), grid connected, commissioned April, 2017; the first screw turbine installation in the US.
 Canada
 The first Archimedes screw turbine was installed in Canada in 2013 near Waterford, Ontario.

References

Further reading 

 P. J. Kantert: Manual for Archimedean Screw Pump, Hirthammer Verlag 2008, 
 P. J. Kantert: Praxishandbuch Schneckenpumpe. Hirthammer Verlag 2008, 
 K. Brada, K.-A. Radlik - Water Screw Motor to Micro Power Plant - First Experiences of Construction and Operation (1998)
 K. Brada - Micro Power Plant with Water Screw Motor (1995)
 K. Brada, K.-A. Radlik - Water Power Screw - Characteristic and Use (1996)
 K. Brada, K.-A. Radlik, (1996). Water screw motor for micropower plant. 6th Intl. Symp. Heat exchange and renewable energy sources, 43–52, W. Nowak, ed. Wydaw Politechniki Szczecińskiej, Szczecin, Poland.

External links 

 spaansbabcock.com/products/screw-turbine Hydropower screw
 Information on one of the manufacturers
  The first screw turbine in Poland

Water turbines
Watermills